Ionic bonding is a type of chemical bonding that involves the electrostatic attraction between oppositely charged ions, or between two atoms with sharply different electronegativities, and is the primary interaction occurring in ionic compounds. It is one of the main types of bonding, along with covalent bonding and metallic bonding. Ions are atoms (or groups of atoms) with an electrostatic charge. Atoms that gain electrons make negatively charged ions (called anions). Atoms that lose electrons make positively charged ions (called cations). This transfer of electrons is known as electrovalence in contrast to covalence. In simpler words, an ionic bond results from the transfer of electrons from a metal to a non-metal in order to obtain a full valence shell for both atoms.

It is important to recognize that clean ionic bonding — in which one atom or molecule completely transfers an electron to another — cannot exist: all ionic compounds have some degree of covalent bonding, or electron sharing. Thus, the term "ionic bonding" is given when the ionic character is greater than the covalent character – that is, a bond in which there is a large difference in electronegativity between the two atoms, causing the bonding to be more polar (ionic) than in covalent bonding where electrons are shared more equally. Bonds with partially ionic and partially covalent character are called polar covalent bonds. 

Ionic compounds conduct electricity when molten or in solution, typically not when solid. Ionic compounds generally have a high melting point, depending on the charge of the ions they consist of. The higher the charges the stronger the cohesive forces and the higher the melting point. They also tend to be soluble in water; the stronger the cohesive forces, the lower the solubility.

Overview
Atoms that have an almost full or almost empty valence shell tend to be very reactive. Atoms that are strongly electronegative (as is the case with halogens) often have only one or two empty orbitals in their valence shell, and frequently bond with other molecules or gain electrons to form anions. Atoms that are weakly electronegative (such as alkali metals) have relatively few valence electrons, which can easily be shared with atoms that are strongly electronegative. As a result, weakly electronegative atoms tend to distort their electron cloud and form cations.

Formation
Ionic bonding can result from a redox reaction when atoms of an element (usually metal), whose ionization energy is low, give some of their electrons to achieve a stable electron configuration. In doing so, cations are formed. An atom of another element (usually nonmetal) with greater electron affinity accepts one or more electrons to attain a stable electron configuration, and after accepting electrons an atom becomes an anion. Typically, the stable electron configuration is one of the noble gases for elements in the s-block and the p-block, and particular stable electron configurations for d-block and f-block elements. The electrostatic attraction between the anions and cations leads to the formation of a solid with a crystallographic lattice in which the ions are stacked in an alternating fashion. In such a lattice, it is usually not possible to distinguish discrete molecular units, so that the compounds formed are not molecular in nature. However, the ions themselves can be complex and form molecular ions like the acetate anion or the ammonium cation.
 
For example, common table salt is sodium chloride. When sodium (Na) and chlorine (Cl) are combined, the sodium atoms each lose an electron, forming cations (Na+), and the chlorine atoms each gain an electron to form anions (Cl−). These ions are then attracted to each other in a 1:1 ratio to form sodium chloride (NaCl).
 Na + Cl → Na+ + Cl− → NaCl 

However, to maintain charge neutrality, strict ratios between anions and cations are observed so that ionic compounds, in general, obey the rules of stoichiometry despite not being molecular compounds. For compounds that are transitional to the alloys and possess mixed ionic and metallic bonding, this may not be the case anymore. Many sulfides, e.g., do form non-stoichiometric compounds.

Many ionic compounds are referred to as salts as they can also be formed by the neutralization reaction of an Arrhenius base like NaOH with an Arrhenius acid like HCl

 NaOH + HCl →  NaCl + H2O

The salt NaCl is then said to consist of the acid rest Cl− and the base rest Na+.

The removal of electrons to form the cation is endothermic, raising the system's overall energy. There may also be energy changes associated with breaking of existing bonds or the addition of more than one electron to form anions. However, the action of the anion's accepting the cation's valence electrons and the subsequent attraction of the ions to each other releases (lattice) energy and, thus, lowers the overall energy of the system.

Ionic bonding will occur only if the overall energy change for the reaction is favorable. In general, the reaction is exothermic, but, e.g., the formation of mercuric oxide (HgO) is endothermic. The charge of the resulting ions is a major factor in the strength of ionic bonding, e.g. a salt C+A− is held together by electrostatic forces roughly four times weaker than C2+A2− according to Coulomb's law, where C and A represent a generic cation and anion respectively. The sizes of the ions and the particular packing of the lattice are ignored in this rather simplistic argument.

Structures

Ionic compounds in the solid state form lattice structures. The two principal factors in determining the form of the lattice are the relative charges of the ions and their relative sizes. Some structures are adopted by a number of compounds; for example, the structure of the rock salt sodium chloride is also adopted by many alkali halides, and binary oxides such as magnesium oxide. Pauling's rules provide guidelines for predicting and rationalizing the crystal structures of ionic crystals

Strength of the bonding

For a solid crystalline ionic compound the enthalpy change in forming the solid from gaseous ions is termed the lattice energy. The experimental value for the lattice energy can  be determined using the Born–Haber cycle. It can also be calculated (predicted) using the Born–Landé equation as the sum of the electrostatic potential energy, calculated by summing interactions between cations and anions, and a short-range repulsive potential energy term. The electrostatic potential can be expressed in terms of the interionic separation and a constant (Madelung constant) that takes account of the geometry of the crystal. The further away from the nucleus the weaker the shield. The Born–Landé equation gives a reasonable fit to the lattice energy of, e.g., sodium chloride, where the calculated (predicted) value is −756 kJ/mol, which compares to −787 kJ/mol using the Born–Haber cycle. In aqueous solution the binding strength can be described by the Bjerrum or Fuoss equation as function of the ion charges, rather independent of the nature of the ions such as polarizability or size  The strength of salt bridges is most often evaluated by measurements of equilibria between molecules containing cationic and anionic sites, most often in solution.  Equilibrium constants in water indicate additive free energy contributions for each salt bridge. Another method for the identification of hydrogen bonds also in complicated molecules is crystallography, sometimes also NMR-spectroscopy.

The attractive forces defining the strength of ionic bonding can be modeled by Coulomb's Law. Ionic bond strengths are typically (cited ranges vary) between 170 and 1500 kJ/mol.

Polarization power effects
Ions in crystal lattices of purely ionic compounds are spherical; however, if the positive ion is small and/or highly charged, it will distort the electron cloud of the negative ion, an effect summarised in Fajans' rules. This polarization of the negative ion leads to a build-up of extra charge density between the two nuclei, that is, to partial covalency. Larger negative ions are more easily polarized, but the effect is usually important only when positive ions with charges of 3+ (e.g., Al3+) are involved. However, 2+ ions (Be2+) or even 1+ (Li+) show some polarizing power because their sizes are so small (e.g., LiI is ionic but has some covalent bonding present).  Note that this is not the ionic polarization effect that refers to displacement of ions in the lattice due to the application of an electric field.

Comparison with covalent bonding
In ionic bonding, the atoms are bound by attraction of oppositely charged ions, whereas, in covalent bonding, atoms are bound by sharing electrons to attain stable electron configurations. In covalent bonding, the molecular geometry around each atom is determined by valence shell electron pair repulsion VSEPR rules, whereas, in ionic materials, the geometry follows maximum packing rules. One could say that covalent bonding is more directional in the sense that the energy penalty for not adhering to the optimum bond angles is large, whereas ionic bonding has no such penalty. There are no shared electron pairs to repel each other, the ions should simply be packed as efficiently as possible. This often leads to much higher coordination numbers. In NaCl, each ion has 6 bonds and all bond angles are 90°. In CsCl the coordination number is 8. By comparison carbon typically has a maximum of four bonds.

Purely ionic bonding cannot exist, as the proximity of the entities involved in the bonding allows some degree of sharing electron density between them. Therefore, all ionic bonding has some covalent character. Thus, bonding is considered ionic where the ionic character is greater than the covalent character. The larger the difference in electronegativity between the two types of atoms involved in the bonding, the more ionic (polar) it is. Bonds with partially ionic and partially covalent character are called polar covalent bonds. For example, Na–Cl and Mg–O interactions have a few percent covalency, while Si–O bonds are usually ~50% ionic and ~50% covalent. Pauling estimated that an electronegativity difference of 1.7 (on the Pauling scale) corresponds to 50% ionic character, so that a difference greater than 1.7 corresponds to a bond which is predominantly ionic.

Ionic character in covalent bonds can be directly measured for atoms having quadrupolar nuclei (2H, 14N, 81,79Br, 35,37Cl or 127I). These nuclei are generally objects of NQR nuclear quadrupole resonance and NMR nuclear magnetic resonance studies. Interactions between the nuclear quadrupole moments Q and the electric field gradients (EFG) are characterized via the nuclear quadrupole coupling constants
QCC =  
where the eqzz term corresponds to the principal component of the EFG tensor and e is the elementary charge. In turn, the electric field gradient opens the way to description of bonding modes in molecules when the QCC values are accurately determined by NMR or NQR methods.  

In general, when ionic bonding occurs in the solid (or liquid) state, it is not possible to talk about a single "ionic bond" between two individual atoms, because the cohesive forces that keep the lattice together are of a more collective nature. This is quite different in the case of covalent bonding, where we can often speak of a distinct bond localized between two particular atoms. However, even if ionic bonding is combined with some covalency, the result is not necessarily discrete bonds of a localized character. In such cases, the resulting bonding often requires description in terms of a band structure consisting of gigantic molecular orbitals spanning the entire crystal. Thus, the bonding in the solid often retains its collective rather than localized nature. When the difference in electronegativity is decreased, the bonding may then lead to a semiconductor, a semimetal or eventually a metallic conductor with metallic bonding.

See also
Coulomb's law
Salt bridge (protein and supramolecular)
Ionic potential
Linear combination of atomic orbitals
Hybridization
Chemical polarity
Ioliomics
Electron configuration
Aufbau principle
Quantum numbers
Azimuthal quantum number
Principal quantum number
Magnetic quantum number
Spin quantum number

References

External links
Ionic bonding tutorial
Video on ionic bonding

Chemical bonding
Ions
Supramolecular chemistry